Saúde is a neighborhood of Rio de Janeiro, Brazil. Its population in 2000 was 2186. Located on the coast, just north of the historical centre in downtown Rio, west of Praça Maua and east of Gamboa, Rio de Janeiro, it contains several notable hospitals such as Hospital dos Servidores de Estado and Hospital Pro Matre; the name Saúde means "Health" in Portuguese. It is marked by many homes for the lower middle class and numerous sheds, warehouses and depots are located in the region.

The Church of Our Lady of Saúde was built in 1789 on the seafront and gave its name to the neighborhood of Saúde, although the church belongs, nowadays, to the neighborhood of Gamboa.

Pedra do Sal, a historic and religious site, is located within Saúde. The Community Descendents of the Quilombos of Pedra do Sal (Portuguese: Comunidade Remanescentes de Quilombos da Pedra do Sal) were recognized as a historic site in 1984 by INEPAC, the Institute for State Cultural Heritage (Instituto Estadual do Patrimônio Cultural).

Notable landmarks
 Building of the 5th Military Police Battalion
 Coronel Assunção Square (Former Harmony Square)
 José Bonifácio Municipal Cultural Center building
 Archaeological Site Cemetery of New Black Slaves
 Children of Talma Theater Dramatic Society building
 Catholic Church of Our Lady of Health
 Catholic Church of Our Lady of Deliverance
 Federal College Pedro II Center Unit
 SAGAS Projects (Preservation of Buildings and Households-Health, Santo Cristo)
Hanging Garden of Valongo
Valongo Observatory
 Building of the Oceanographic Institute of the Brazilian Army
 Fortress of Morro da Conceicao
 Morro da Providencia Residential Complex
 Quilombola Archaeological Site of Pedra do Sal
 Catholic Church of San Francisco da Motta
 Residential and Commercial Complex of Largo da Prainha
 Largo Joao da Bahia
 Pedra do Sal Slave and Commercial Warehouse
 Stone Carved Staircases of Pedra do Sal
 Chapel of Souls in Morro da Providência
 Bandstand at Praça da Harmonia
 Historical Statues of Praça Coronel Assunção
 Villa Regia Hotel

References

Neighbourhoods in Rio de Janeiro (city)